Tha Wung is a district (amphoe) in western part of Lopburi province, central Thailand.

History
The district was created 1912, formerly named Pho Wi.

Geography
The main water resource of Tha Wung are the Lopburi and Bang Kham Rivers.

Neighboring districts are (from the north clockwise) Ban Mi and Mueang Lopburi of Lopburi Province, Chaiyo of Ang Thong province and Phrom Buri and Mueang Sing Buri of Singburi province.

Administration
The district is divided into 11 sub-districts (tambons), which are further subdivided into 128 villages (mubans). Tha Wung has township (thesaban tambon) status and covers parts of tambon Tha Wung. Tha Khlong is another township which covers parts of tambon Khao Samo Khon. There are 10 tambon administrative organizations (TAO).

Tha Wung